Irumbu Kuthirai is a 2014 Indian Tamil-language action film written and directed by Yuvaraj Bose and produced by AGS Entertainment. The film stars Atharvaa, Priya Anand and Johnny Tri Nguyen in the leading roles, while Raai Laxmi appears in a supporting role. The film was released on 29 August 2014.

Plot
Prithviraj Narayanan (Atharvaa) is a Pizza Delivery Boy. He lives with his mother Mary (Devadarshini) and his sister. His bestfriends are Jagan (Jagan) and Christina (Raai Laxmi).

Prithvi receives complaints from his boss (Manobala) for slow pizza delivery, he follows every rule on riding the bike after a bike accident where he witnessed his father's death. Prithvi falls in love with Samyuktha alias Sam (Priya Anand), they become friends and she asks him to buy a bike. Samyuktha suggested him to get a second-hand black Ducati Diavel known as the Raven.

But that very bike brings danger to Prithvi due to a shocking past. One day Prithvi and Sam get into an argument when he attempts to kiss her and she tells him that she only likes him as a friend. On the way home, Samyuktha is kidnapped by mysterious bikers. Prithvi, Jagan and Christina look for clues to find the kidnappers. The kidnapper is revealed to be Don Stoney (Johnny Tri Nguyen) who was the first owner of Prithviraj's bike.

Don Stoney named his bike as the Raven for its extreme speed. Stoney was fired from Motocross in France after he beats a guy to death for scratching his Raven. Stoney is obsessed with his Raven. Stoney's brother, Roger, takes Raven and competes with another racer called Michael (who's always wearing a helmet and whose face is never shown). At the race, Roger loses the Raven to Michael. Unable to face his brother, Roger commits suicide. For 3 years Don Stoney has been searching high and low for his Raven, and the racer Michael – whom he sees as the cause of his brother's death.

Prithvi receives a call from Stoney who asks him to come to his hideout at Mahé if he wants Samyuktha back safely. As Prithvi leaves, Jagan talks to Christina, who reveals the truth about Prithvi – his full name is Michael Prithviraj Narayanan. Prithvi is none other than the Michael who rightfully won the Raven.

Michael enters a race against Stoney and wagers pink slips for the Raven. During the race, Stoney gains an advantage, but loses it when Michael uses his extreme skill to catch up to Stoney, handing the victory to Michael. Afterwards, Stoney releases Samyuktha and says that he does not want the Raven without winning it. He tells Michael that one day he will come back to challenge him again for the Raven, and that until then, Michael is the only other person worthy of possessing the Raven. He lets Michael and Samyuktha go, who then leave on the Raven, heading back home.

Cast

Atharvaa as Michael Prithviraj Narayanan
Johnny Tri Nguyen as Don Stoney
Priya Anand as Samyuktha Ramakrishnan
Raai Laxmi as Christina
Jagan as Jagan
Manobala as Prithviraj's boss
Mayilsamy as Jeevan Ramesh
Devadarshini as Mary Narayanan
Anupama Kumar as Samyuktha's aunt
Swaminathan as traffic police
Sachu as Prithviraj's grandmother
Joe Malloori as Rooban
Neelu as Manobala's father
Joshna Fernando as Christina's sister
Kaajal Pasupathi as Assistant Commissioner
Chu Khoy Sheng as Roger
Alisha Abdullah as Don's assistant (guest appearance)
Akshara Gowda as item number "Pondicherry"
Ducati Diavel as Raven
Nakshatra Nagesh as school girl

Production
AGS Entertainment announced that they were simultaneously producing six films in March 2013 and revealed one of those would be a "racy action script" featuring Atharvaa to be directed by newcomer Yuvraj Bose, a former assistant of Arivazhagan. Priya Anand was signed on to feature in the film in August 2013, while Lakshmi Rai and Johnny Tri Nguyen, previously seen in AR Murugadoss's 7aum Arivu, were selected to portray other roles. Writer Narsim debuted as a dialogue writer for this film.

In October 2013, the team moved on to film a schedule in Italy for 20 days, canning scenes and songs after finishing another schedule in Puducherry. In November 2013 it was reported that Lakshmi Rai was out of the project, and a relative newcomer, Joshna Fernando, was hired and he shot for some sequences and a song with the cast in the Italy schedule. In a turn of events, Lakshmi Rai began filming for the project again in March 2014. Akshara Gowda shot for a dance number in the film.

Soundtrack

Critical reception
The Hindu wrote, "Yuvaraj Bose, does a lot of small things right...There is taste, restraint, and a strong sense of aesthetics. Everything belongs – except the songs, which are terrible speed breakers...The bigger problem with Irumbu Kuthirai is that it lacks a pulse. It’s okay that the early portions coast along with a nonchalant vibe, but this cannot sustain the latter parts that are about intense showdowns on Ducatis". The Times of India "Irumbu Kuthirai has been publicized as a bike racing film but what really works is the romance...The (...) sore point is the mood-killing songs. But, most importantly, the racing portions are a letdown. The role of the antagonist is underwritten and thus, we are never taken in by this part of the film". Sify wrote, "Irumbu Kuthirai in spite its rich production values and slick camerawork falls prey to a lot of compromises like half a dozen songs which pop up at regular intervals, the melodrama and romance in the large dose" and concluded that "it fails on the script level which Yuvraj Bose has tried to compensate with a glossy presentation". The New Indian Express wrote, "Irumbu Kuthirai's trailer promised much – a film with lots of action and thrill and bike racing stunts. But the film fails to match up to it due to its superficial take on both its emotional quotient and action quota...apart from a few impressively choreographed bike chase and fight scenes, there is not much going for the film".

References

External links
 

2010s Tamil-language films
2014 films
Indian chase films
Films shot in Venice
2014 action films
Indian action films
Motorcycling films
Films scored by G. V. Prakash Kumar
Films shot in Puducherry
2010s chase films
2014 directorial debut films